Buses were introduced to Malta in 1905. As well as providing public transport across the country, up until 2011, the traditional Malta bus (Maltese: xarabank or karozza tal-linja) served as a popular tourist attraction due to their unique appearances grounded in the bus ownership and operation model employed in the country; by the end of this traditional operation, Malta had several bus types no longer in service anywhere else in the world.

The unique nature of the Malta bus stemmed from the tradition of local ownership of the buses by the drivers, and their historic practice of customising them. In addition to a high degree of customisation, detailing and decoration, several Malta buses also had a unique appearance due to the practice of in-house maintenance, rebuilding or modifying of bus bodies in local workshops.

As an iconic feature of the country, the classic Malta bus features on several tourist related items. As the main mode of public transport across the country, the Malta bus was also used by many tourists to visit the different parts of the country. While newer Malta buses were progressively introduced that followed modern standard bus designs found elsewhere, customisation and detailing had continued for these buses as well.

On 3 July 2011, the network of service bus routes across Malta was taken over by Arriva, with traditional buses reduced to operating on only special heritage services.

Arriva introduced a fleet of modern low-floor buses, importing second hand ex-London articulated Mercedes-Benz Citaros, retaining and repainting some of the 'newest' buses from the old fleet in Arriva colours as well as purchasing a fleet of brand new King Long rigid buses. Arriva's operation in Malta was beset by problems; three fires within a 48-hour period in August 2013 prompted the Maltese government to ban the articulated Citaros from operation in the country pending an investigation.

Arriva operation in Malta continued until 1 January 2014, when the nation's bus network was nationalised as Malta Public Transport. On 8 January 2015, Malta Public Transport was reprivatised as it was sold to Autobuses Urbanos de León (an ALSA subsidiary), who retained the Malta Public Transport brand name. The company doubled the bus fleet, which now consists of more than 400 buses.

Malta Public Transport has invested extensively in modernizing its bus fleet making it safer, more environmentally friendly, and more comfortable. The company invested in 200 new buses with the latest Euro VI diesel technology. The buses are cleaned and maintained regularly, and are equipped with air-conditioning systems for added comfort. All the new buses have two doors to facilitate boarding and alighting of passengers.

Original bus system (1905–2011)

History
The first buses were imported to Malta in 1905 from Thornycroft in England by Edward Agius of Ed T Agius Ltd (coal shipping). He formed the Malta Motor Omnibus and Transport Syndicate Ltd  with his brother-in-law Joseph Muscat to operate the first bus service between Valletta and St Julians. As early as 1920, bus manufacturing was taking place on the island, with local carpenters and mechanics constructing bus body coachwork for local transport companies.

In the 1920s, operation of buses on public transport routes was subject to open competition between operators, and as such, buses used were not necessarily well turned out. With the formation of the Traffic Control Board in 1931, greater regulation and discipline of the system meant that operators began to upgrade the appearance of their buses. Since then, the tradition of showing pride in the vehicles has been maintained, through decoration and customisation of the buses.

Since reform in the 1970s, bus operation was centralised under a worker cooperative, the Public Transport Association, or Assoċjazzjoni Trasport Pubbliku (ATP), in 1977. This association became responsible for the centralised day-to-day operational management of bus services, producing a unified timetable roster and basic livery, although this did not change the ownership arrangements for the buses. The overall transport system was regulated under the Malta Transport Authority (ADT).

In December 2003, in light of over 100 buses being scrapped, a government subsidised tour bus service using traditional Malta buses, as the "VisitMalta bus", was set up by the tourism and transport ministries, although this was withdrawn in April 2005.

While the buses generally remain popular among tourists and nostalgic Maltese, the original system was infamous and unpopular with some parts of the local population who considered the service as inefficient and polluting, driven by drivers who were sometimes very impolite to passengers. This resulted in a significant increase in private car ownership among the population, and today only one in ten trips are made via public transportation. One extreme case to note occurred on 29 June 2010, when a driver attempted to forcibly pull a Spanish tourist out of her seat and off the bus following a row over seven cents in change.

Operational system

The operation model dated back to a system introduced in 1977. The ATP authority determined the schedules, which were then operated by the private bus owners, who remained responsible for the condition and upkeep of their buses, either as owner operators, or in groups. As such, several buses were kept at the family homes of the drivers in question, or based in small garage locations.

To ensure fair distribution of both good and bad routes, the daily operation of buses was allocated on a rota basis, with buses operating on a 'day on, day off' basis, whereby one day half of the buses operate on the public routes, while the other half were used for private hire, or as school buses, or undergo maintenance.

Malta buses on public transport duties were seen in high concentrations at the main City Gate Square bus terminus at Valletta surrounding the Triton Fountain, from where the vast majority of scheduled routes departed. Other major centres of traffic included Buġibba, St Paul's Bay, Sliema and Mosta.

Former liveries and types

Early buses wore an olive green livery with a black stripe. In the 1930s, buses were painted different colours according to the route they operated. In 1975 buses were painted green, and from 1995 vehicles carried in a yellow (lower) and white (upper) livery, relieved by a red band just below the window line. Gozo buses were grey with a red band below the window.

All Malta buses immediately prior to the 2011 reform were single-deckers, with bus or coach bodies. Early buses did not have many common transit bus features, with route numbers displayed using white cards. Later buses had modern features such as electronic destination displays, but these were still not used to indicate the bus's destination, showing only the number of the route.

Very early types of bus could still be found but no longer in service, with a front engine mounted in an extended bonneted nose, in the style of some conventional trucks. The majority of classic Malta buses had elaborate grilles and headlight arrangements, curved windscreens and sloping roofs. Later makes of bus were usually of conventional bus and coach designs that were in use elsewhere in the world, such as  Plaxton Supreme and Duple Dominant bodywork.

Between 1981 and 1987 the fleet was drastically modernised with the import of over 260 second hand buses from the United Kingdom. Many of the oldest buses in the fleet were further replaced with the influx of 150 new low-floor buses from China and Turkey, financed with government grant aid, leaving just three normal control vehicles.

Second hand imports from the UK had continued up to 2008, with some of the last examples being Alexander Dash bodied Volvo B6s deemed surplus after Stagecoach's takeover of Yorkshire Traction. Even with these fleet modernisations, the nearly 500 strong bus fleet still contained some examples dating from the 1950s which remained in operational service as recently as 2011, prior to the bus reform.

Detailing 

Malta buses were characterised by their high level of customisation and detailing. Common additions to former route buses included:

 Increased use chrome parts / high polishing of chrome parts, such as hubcaps and grilles
 Paint detailing, both generally, and of parts such as indicators and filler caps
 Custom passenger messages, both in the interior and exterior of the bus
 Names relating to the village patron saint, monarchs, or other notable objects.
 Trimmings and hangings, especially inside the front window
 Slogans, murals, quotations and lucky images (such as the horseshoe)

Due to the nature of operation of Malta buses, many of the drivers were also mechanics, and a high number of Malta buses proudly displayed the name of the manufacturer of the chassis or body of the bus, or the engine type used. In some instances though, these names are not actually the name of the bus in question.

Preservation

The preservation organisation Heritage Malta purchased 90 buses after the restructuring of the bus network and is currently in the process of restoring them to their original condition and preserving their customised modifications. These efforts were aided by expertise and parts provided by many of the vehicle's former owners. It is planned that these newly renovated buses will then be exhibited in an industrial heritage museum.

Since 2011, various of the old buses have been repainted in their original pre-1975 colours. A notable example is the Gozo Mail Bus which was painted red with a white stripe.

MaltaPost issued a set of 20 postage stamps to commemorate the withdrawal of service of the traditional Malta buses on 2 July 2011, a day before the restructure. The stamps showed Maltese buses in the different colours which existed for the different routes.

Arriva (2011–2013)

A major restructure of the bus service in Malta took place on 3 July 2011. The network was taken over by Arriva, new low-floor buses were introduced and service and fare structures changed dramatically.

Halcrow Group was commissioned to assess the Malta bus system. Released in November 2005, the report criticizing the existing model and arrangement between ADT and ATP, which had produced a very low utilization of buses and a decline of 50% in the number of bus passengers between 1979 and 2009.

Finalized plans were announced in December 2008 for the first bus route restructuring on Malta since 1977. Under European Union rules, the right to operate the new network could not be directly transferred to the ATP, although they were free to tender for the contract. This resulted in the end of the state-subsidized owner-operator model, which as of 2009 stood at 508 buses each with an average age of 35 years, and operated by over 400 independent licensees.

The new fleet controlled by Arriva consisted of 264 buses, including 2 seven-metre buses for the intra-Valletta route, 61 nine-metre buses including 10 hybrid electric buses for park & ride services as well as selected village routes (Mater Dei-Ta' Qali, Paola-Xgħajra-Paola), 153 twelve metre buses, and 46 articulated buses for airport routes and major routes such as those to Sliema, Malta International Airport and the ferry terminals.

The new system increased the number of available bus seats by 6,600 to 20,500, and the number of bus stops in Malta to 850 plus another 120 in Gozo.

The major benefits to the public for the change were presented in November 2010:

 €3.5m less per year in Malta government subsidy
 First ever all day bus service in Gozo, 7 days a week
 One fare everywhere
 Cheap weekly fares for non-residents
 New buses (for 70% of the fleet)
 All buses with less polluting Euro V engines
 Substantially lower emissions
 All buses fully accessible
 Air-conditioning and CCTV on all buses
 More routes, more frequent
 More termini, more interchanges
 Longer operating hours for all routes
 Night service
 Maximum waiting times for all routes
 Schedules and bus arrival times an SMS away
 More information on buses and bus stops
 More employment
 More discipline
 Better trained drivers
 An aquamarine coloured livery

The bus fleet, all in Arriva's standard aquamarine and cream livery, was composed of Euro V King Long buses along with Arriva London's Mercedes-Benz Citaro G articulated buses. Some of the newer buses from the previous operator had also been introduced into the new system. The network receives a subsidy of around €6 million per year. Passengers holding Maltese ID cards receive a 40% reduction of the price of their journeys due to subsidised fares, while non-ID card holders (including tourists) pay the full undiscounted fare, prompting the European Commission to launch an inquiry on whether the two-tiered price structure violates EU discrimination laws.

The commencement of Arriva's services on 3 July 2011 was marred by many buses departing late or failing to turn up, primarily due to the absence of over 70 drivers who were due to transfer from the previous driver-owner system. This resulted in large crowds building up at Valletta's new bus terminus as well as other termini and stages across Malta.

Other issues increased the delays, such as incorrect or non-operational route information on buses and mechanical faults. Arriva has also received criticism over the overhauled routes and timetables, which has increased journey times for some passengers.

During the first week of the new system, up to 180 drivers, most of whom had previously worked on the old network, failed to appear for duties. They cited Arriva's use of split-shifts as the reason for their non-appearance, as these had reportedly not been part of the conditions they had agreed to work under. Their actions received some criticism, with politician Emanuel Delia accusing the drivers of attempting to sabotage services so that the new system would be abandoned. Arriva responded by drafting in seventy temporary drivers from its UK operation and trained further Maltese drivers to cover for the missing employees. Some services were subcontracted to other companies.

A new shift pattern took effect at the end of July 2011. A series of changes to the new routes in response to criticism were announced on 23 July 2011, to be implemented between July and October. In August 2011, Arriva recognised the General Workers’ Union as a representative of its employees in the country. Further changes affecting 112 routes were announced in October by transport minister Austin Gatt, introducing more buses to Valletta and Mater Dei Hospital.

Arriva has been harshly criticized both by commuters and by the government agency Transport Malta for consistently failing to keep up standards. On 14 November 2012, Arriva was harshly reprimanded by Transport Malta and given until the end of the month to bring up all its routes to 100% efficiency before TM deploys its own shuttles at Arriva's expense.

In August 2013, the Government of Malta instructed Arriva Malta to remove the articulated buses from service, pending investigation following three major fire outbreaks in the span of 48 hours. The fires destroyed the buses and in one case caused extensive damage to some nearby vehicles belonging to MaltaPost, the country's postal operator. Nobody was injured in these incidents. Like in the UK when the same buses had caught fire, these buses became a popular joke in conversations and social media sites.

By the end of December 2013 Arriva had run up losses of €50 million in two and a half years.

Malta Public Transport (2014–present)

On 1 January 2014 Arriva ceased operations in Malta having been nationalised as Malta Public Transport by the Maltese government, with the intention of reprivatising the system under a new operator once one could be found.

Initially the buses, routes, livery, and tickets remained the same, but soon after the Arriva logos on buses were removed. New tickets with the name of the new company were introduced, and there were some minor changes in routes. By April 2014, three companies had submitted bids to operate the new bus services, these being Autobuses Urbanos de León, Gozo First, and Island Buses Malta.

In May 2014 eleven new buses arrived in Malta, leased as the first part of a temporary new fleet of 45 buses to operate for Malta Public Transport. They were put to service in June 2014, and they were painted white with a small logo of Malta Public Transport.

As of October 2014 the government has chosen Autobuses Urbanos de León, subsidiary of ALSA Group, as its preferred bus operator for the country. The company took over the bus service on 8 January 2015, while retaining the name Malta Public Transport. The buses leased in the summer of 2014 were returned and the existing fleet was rebranded with a white and lime green livery.

Malta Public Transport has invested extensively in modernizing its bus fleet making it safer, more environmentally friendly, and more comfortable. The company invested in 200 new buses with the latest Euro 6 diesel technology. The buses are cleaned and maintained regularly, and are equipped with air-conditioning systems for added comfort. All the new buses have two doors to facilitate boarding and alighting of passengers.

In the summer of 2015, the company introduced the personalised Tallinja Card smart card which provided cheaper fares and faster boarding to Maltese residents. By 2019, over 320,000 individuals had a personalised tallinja card. Bus use increased by around 20% following the introduction of the card.

Since October 2022, Malta Public Transport has been free for all residents of the country with a valid personalized Tallinja Card.

Open-top buses

Open-top bus operation on Malta was first proposed in the early 1990s, when several double-deck vehicles were imported from the United Kingdom by private company Garden of Eden. The Transport Authority refused to license their operation as passengers standing on the top deck could reach a height over four metres, the maximum level allowed. In June 2007, this decision was reversed and two tourist services, a north tour and a south tour, began operation using eight open-top vehicles and this has since been expanded with a similar tour on Gozo introduced.

See also 

Customised buses
List of bus routes in Malta
Transport in Malta
Vehicle registration plates of Malta

References

External links

Malta Public Transport
Pictures of Malta buses fan site
Malta & Gozo Route Buses fan site
Italian documentary about Maltese buses

Bus transport in Malta
Customised buses
Transport in Malta
Tourism in Malta